Girl on the Edge is a 2015 American drama film directed by Jay Silverman and starring Taylor Spreitler, Gil Bellows, Elizabeth Peña and Peter Coyote. The film premiered at the 2015 Sedona Film Festival.

Cast
Taylor Spreitler as Hannah Green
Peter Coyote as Hank Taylor
Gil Bellows as Jake Green
Amy Price-Francis as Anne Green
Shane Graham as Tommy Miller
Elizabeth Peña as Esther
Amy Davidson as Ariel
Rex Lee as Travis Lee
Mackenzie Phillips as Deborah Green

Reception
Radio Times awarded the film three stars out of five.

References

External links
 
 

American drama films
2015 drama films
2015 films
2010s English-language films
2010s American films